A fire broke out shortly after 2:30am on October 24, 1976, at the Puerto Rican Social Club in the Bronx, New York City, as a result of arson. Jose Antonio Cordero, reportedly either a jealous lover or enraged family member of a woman attending the club, offered two teenagers, Francisco Mendez and Hector Lopez, rum and marijuana in exchange for setting fire to the club. Mendez poured gasoline around the property, while Lopez set it alight. The fire spread quickly, and club patrons found the fire escape blocked by a metal door that had been installed to prevent burglaries. The fire killed 25 patrons and injured 24 others. Cordero pleaded guilty to arson, Mendez pleaded guilty to 25 counts of murder, and Lopez received a life sentence for striking the match.

References 

 

1976 crimes in the United States
1976 disasters in the United States
1976 fires in the United States
1976 in New York City
1976 murders in the United States
October 1976 events in the United States
1970s crimes in New York City
1970s in the Bronx
20th-century mass murder in the United States
Arson in New York City
Arson in the 1970s
Attacks on buildings and structures in 1970
Attacks on buildings and structures in the United States
Building and structure fires in New York City
Crimes in the Bronx
Disasters in the Bronx
Fires in New York City
Fire disasters involving barricaded escape routes
Mass murder in New York City
Mass murder in New York (state)
Mass murder in the United States
Massacres in 1976
Massacres in the United States
Morrisania, Bronx
Murder in New York City
Nightclub fires